Manfred Rüsing (born 3 June 1946) is a retired German footballer.

References

External links
 

1946 births
Living people
German footballers
Bundesliga players
2. Bundesliga players
VfL Bochum players
1. FC Nürnberg players
Association football defenders